Jung Sung-Min (born 2 May 1989) is a South Korean football forward who plays for Busan IPark.

Club career
Jung, having spent his youth career with Kwangwoon University, was selected by Gangwon FC from the 2011 K-League draft intake.  His first game for Gangwon was as a late substitute in the second round match of the 2011 K-League Cup against the Chunnam Dragons. His first match in the K-League itself was also as a late match substitute, in the drawn match against Seongnam Ilhwa Chunma on 8 May 2011.

Honors
Individual
 K-League Reserve League Top scorer : 2011

Club career statistics

References

External links

1989 births
Living people
Association football forwards
South Korean footballers
Gangwon FC players
Gyeongnam FC players
Chungju Hummel FC players
Asan Mugunghwa FC players
Seongnam FC players
Busan IPark players
K League 1 players
K League 2 players